Abdallah Majurah Bulembo is a Tanzanian politician and a member of the Chama Cha Mapinduzi political party. He was elected MP representing Dodoma in 2015.

References 

Living people
Chama Cha Mapinduzi politicians
Tanzanian MPs 2015–2020
Year of birth missing (living people)